Nadia Fanchini (born 25 June 1986) is a World Cup  alpine ski racer from Italy. Born in Lovere, she lives in Val Camonica. Her sisters Elena and Sabrina Fanchini were also members of the Italian World Cup team.

Career
Fanchini represented Italy at the 2006 Winter Olympics and at four World Championships. She won a bronze medal in the downhill at the 2009 World Championships in Val d'Isère, France, and a silver medal in the downhill at the 2013 World Championships in Schladming, Austria.

In the final World Cup race before the 2010 Winter Olympics, Fanchini injured both knees in a Super-G. She missed the Olympics and the remainder of the 2010 season, as well as the 2011 season.

World Cup results

Season standings

Race podiums
 2 wins – (1 SG, 1 DH) 
 13 podiums – (8 DH, 4 SG, 1 GS)

World Championship results

Olympic results

National titles
Nadia Fanchini has won 13 national titles.

Italian Alpine Ski Championships
Downhill: 2004, 2006, 2008, 2019 (4)
Super-G:  2004, 2006, 2008, 2014, 2015, 2016, 2019 (7)
Giant slalom: 2015 (1)
Combined: 20004 (1)

References

External links
 
 Italian Winter Sports Federation – (FISI) – alpine skiing – Nadia Fanchini – 
  

1986 births
Living people
Sportspeople from the Province of Bergamo
Italian female alpine skiers
Alpine skiers at the 2006 Winter Olympics
Alpine skiers at the 2014 Winter Olympics
Alpine skiers at the 2018 Winter Olympics
Olympic alpine skiers of Italy
Alpine skiers of Fiamme Gialle
People from Lovere